Jim Reid (born November 8, 1957) is a former Canadian football fullback who played in the Canadian Football League for most of his career with the Ottawa Rough Riders.

Reid played football at Wilfrid Laurier University where he won the Peter Gorman Trophy as Rookie of the Year.  Reid was part of the Hamilton Tiger-Cats' territorial exemption in the 1979 CFL draft.  He did not play the full 1979 season as a result of knee surgery.  Because of the knee injury, Hamilton traded Reid along with Bill Banks to Ottawa in exchange for Ray Honey.

References 

1957 births
Living people
People from Wellington County, Ontario
Hamilton Tiger-Cats players
Ottawa Rough Riders players
Wilfrid Laurier Golden Hawks football players
Canadian football running backs
Players of Canadian football from Ontario